Enguerrand (or Engrand, Ingrand) is a medieval French name, derived from a Germanic name Engilram (Engelram, Ingelram), from Angil, the tribal name of the Angles, and hramn "raven".

The Old Frankish name is recorded in various forms during the 8th to 11th centuries, the oldest attestation being Angalramnus, the name of a bishop of Metz of the 8th century; other forms include Angilrammus, Angelramnus, Ingalramnus, Ingilramnus, Ingelranmus, Engilramnus, Engilhram, Engilram, Engelram and Hengelrannus. The Old French form Enguerran(d) is recorded as borne by a number of high medieval noblemen of Picardy. The name was taken to England with the Norman Conquest, and was adopted there as Ingram by the late medieval period.

The name was also conflated with a number of distinct, similar-sounding Germanic names, such as Ingerman, which has as its first element the name Ingvar.

Notable people with these names include:

Given name 
Angalram (Ingelram) (died 791), bishop of Metz
 Ingerman of Hesbaye (fl. 8th century), also recorded as Enguerrand, a Duke of Hesbaye
Ingelram count of Harelbeke (Enguerrand of Flandres), d. c. 853
 Engelram, Chamberlain of France (died 877), Chamberlain to Charles the Bald
 Enguerrand I of Ponthieu (died 1045), a Count of Ponthieu
 Enguerrand, count of Saint-Pol (fl. 1040s)
 Enguerrand II of Ponthieu (died 1053), another Count of Ponthieu
 Enguerrand I, Lord of Coucy (died 1116), scandalous Lord of Coucy
 Enguerrand (bishop of Glasgow) (died 1174)
 Enguerrand III, Lord of Coucy (died 1242)
 Enguerrand de Marigny (died 1315), Chamberlain of Philip IV the Fair, King of the French
 Enguerrand VI, Lord of Coucy (died 1347), another Lord of Coucy
 Enguerrand VII, Lord of Coucy (died 1397), another Lord of Coucy and Earl of Bedford
 Enguerrand de Monstrelet (died 1453), a French chronicler
 Enguerrand Quarton (c.1410 – c.1466), French painter and manuscript illuminator

Surname 
 Christine Engrand (born 1955), French politician
 Georges Enguerrand, French cyclist at the 1920 Summer Olympics
 Max Ingrand (1908–1969), French artist working in stained glass

See also
Ingram (given name)
Ingram (surname)

References